Simona Vintilă (born 25 February 1980 in Călărași) is a Romanian football striker who played for two seasons (2003–05) in FC Barcelona, in the Spanish Superliga Femenina. She subsequently played in Primera Nacional's UD Fasnia (05-06) and Sporting Plaza de Argel (06-08).

References

External links 
Profile at aupaathletic.com

Living people
1980 births
Romanian women's footballers
Romanian expatriate sportspeople in Spain
Romania women's international footballers
Expatriate women's footballers in Spain
FC Barcelona Femení players
Primera División (women) players
Women's association football forwards
Sporting Plaza de Argel players
People from Călărași